NK Kustošija is a Croatian football club based in Zagreb. It was founded in 1929.

As of the 2017–18 season, the club's senior team participates in the 2. HNL. Kustošija also have a football school attached to the club, where a number of children of famous Croatians have trained due to its location in the center of Zagreb.

History 
Kustošija were founded as Metalac and played in the second Yugoslavian leagues for parts of the 1940s, 1950s and 1960s.

Kustošija participated in the 2013–14 Croatian Cup, winning in the preliminary round but losing 5–1 to Hajduk Split in the first round.

Kustošija won the 4. HNL center division in 2015–16 to gain promotion to the 3. HNL after spending a number of years in lower leagues. The team promoted from the Croatian sixth division to the second division within five years after Vladimir Babić became chairman.

Current squad

References 

Football clubs in Croatia
Football clubs in Zagreb
Association football clubs established in 1929
1929 establishments in Croatia